Arch-Con Corporation is a commercial construction company based Houston, Texas. Founded in 2000, most of the company's activities are in the Southwestern United States.

Overview 
Arch-Con Corporation was founded in 2000 in Houston, Texas by Michael Scheurich. Arch-Con began in the Houston area, working on commercial projects near metropolitan areas. Its first project was an entrance for Continental Manufacturing in Houston in 2000, following by a hotel project for Americas Best Value Inn in 2001.

In 2009, the company relocated its main office to West Gray near River Oaks in Houston. The company re-structured in 2010 and worked on medical facilities and the Whole Foods Market at Vintage Marketplace.

In 2014, the company reached $100 million in revenue. Starting from 2018, the company expanded its activity to a number of states including California, Colorado, Arizona and Oklahoma, among others.

In 2019, Arch-Con had $0.5 billion revenue in its annual report.

Due to the severe winter storm  and 2021 Texas power crisis, a few of the Arch-Con’s job sites sustained significant damage but the company reported it did not experience any serious economic impact.

Offices 
Arch-Con Corporation recently completed construction on a new corporate headquarters in downtown Houston with satellite offices in Dallas (2015), Austin (2020) and Denver (2021). It operates in Texas, Oklahoma, Arizona, California, Colorado, Florida and Louisiana.

Philanthropy 
Arch-Con has been involved with charity projects such as Houston-based The Center, SEARCH Homeless Services Care Hub, the American Heart Association and the Northwest Alliance Ministries Harrell Family Opportunity Center. In 2021, the company received a Good Brick Award for restoring the Joseph A. Tennant House, a culturally significant landmark designed by the architect John F. Staub in the Broadacres Historic District.

Projects  
 Southlink Logistics Center (1,000,000-square-foot)
Home Depot Distribution Center (657,000-square-foot; under construction)
Regent Square project (600-unit apartment complex) 
Buffalo Heights District Project (742,000-square-foot)
Park 20 Distribution Center (468,000-square-foot) 
Village Towers(120,000-square-foot)
Prologis Park Trinity Boulevard (156,000-square-foot)
1.5M-SF distribution center near Baytown (under construction)
Houston Physicians’ Hospital
Medical Center of Tomball
Palace Bowling Lanes (88,000-square-foot)

References 

Economy of the Southwestern United States
Construction and civil engineering companies of the United States
Companies based in Houston
Construction and civil engineering companies established in 2000
2000 establishments in Texas